The Number Painter, also known as The Mad Painter, was the title character of a series of comedy live-action short films produced for the children's television program Sesame Street. This series of slapstick films — each one ran anywhere from one minute to 90 seconds — were used to teach children number recognition, including appearance and symbolic representation of Arabic numerals, and how the number is drawn. As such, "The Number Painter" contrasted with the show's other animated and live-action number-related skits, where the primary focus was on counting.

There were ten "Number Painter" skits produced in the series, one each for the numbers 2 through 11. The number 1 skit was not produced, since it was not featured in individual Sesame Street segments during the era when the films were produced and aired.  Although the numbers showcased up to 12 in this same era, the number 12 film was not produced either, with the number 11 being the last segment in the "Number Painter" series.

The title character and protagonist in these movies, portrayed by Paul Benedict, was an eccentric character who enjoys painting numbers in a series of public and private locations. His outfit consists of a black-and-white striped shirt, gray pants held up with suspenders, black Chuck Taylor Converse sneakers, and a paint-splattered smock, topped with a black bowler hat. He carries a can of paint and a brush, along with a cut-out of the number he intends to paint. The Painter never spoke on-camera, although his thoughts were heard using voice over.

The films were produced in 1971, and the first film in the series — that for the number 2 — aired on February 23, 1972. Given Sesame Street's format of replaying and recycling its vignettes, the Painter skits continued to be rebroadcast into the 1980s, concurrent with Benedict going on to be a regular in the sitcom The Jeffersons and recurring co-star Stockard Channing launching a film and TV career. Robert Dennis composed the jaunty piano score in each of the segments. Eliot Noyes Jr. directed and produced the series.

Skit format
The skits in each of the films followed the same basic format. The Painter announces that he is going to paint a specific number, all while scouting out a suitable location to engage in said activity; he would then pull a model of that number from his smock to emphasize its shape to the viewers.

Any one of a number of objects were fair game to the Painter, including sailboat sails, slices of bread, umbrellas, rubber balls, elevator doors and even a bald man's head. At one point (in the #8 film), the Painter's work became the subject of a dramatic, large-font newspaper headline ("PAINTER STRIKES AGAIN!"). Several of the films ended with the Painter having to deal with people who were upset over his activities.

Supporting characters

Mac
Portrayed by Broadway actor Jerome Raphael, Mac was the most frequent  target of the Number Painter's antics. He appeared in seven of the skits, including the owner of a boat (#2), a baker (#6), a passenger in an elevator (#7), an unassuming homeowner enjoying a lazy afternoon in his swimming pool (#8), an operator of a street-cleaning truck (#9), and a janitor (#10 and 11). Usually, Mac managed to foil—either deliberately or unwittingly—the Painter's work; only once was the Painter able to get the upper hand (in the #8 film).

The Woman
Stockard Channing — who went on to greater fame in Grease and The West Wing—appeared in four of the sketches, playing the woman at the picnic (#3); the woman holding the umbrella (#4); the woman inside the elevator having her plastic handbag painted on (#7); and, finally, the doctor saying "Next" to her patients (#11).

Sketch list

References

Television characters introduced in 1972
Fictional painters
Sesame Street segments
Number